SSFP can refer to:
 Service specific face plate, a telephone socket filter
 Steady-state free precession imaging, a family of pulse sequences for magnetic resonance imaging